Marguerite-Hélène Mahé (1903 - 1996) was a French writer from Réunion, who is best known for her work Sortilèges créoles: Eudora ou l'île enchantée (fr), published first in 1952, serialised into three issues of Revue des Deux Mondes. It was subsequently reissued whole, twice, in 1955 and 1985. It is a pivotal work in Reunionnais literature, due to its descriptions of the lives of those enslaved on the island. It was also the first novel created by a Réunionese writer to use modernism and fantasy. She also wrote an autobiography, which is as yet unpublished.

References

External links 

 SORTILÈGES CRÉOLES: Première Partie (in French)

1903 births
1996 deaths
Writers from Réunion
20th-century French women writers
People from Réunion
Women from Réunion
20th-century French novelists